Walkowitz is a surname. Notable people with the surname include:

Abraham Walkowitz (1878–1965), American painter
Daniel Walkowitz (born 1942), American historian